Divya Vishwanath, also known as Divya Padmini, is an actress in Malayalam and Tamil television programs and films. She made her television debut on Manapporuttam serial alongside Prem Prakash.

Career
While Padmini was studying at NSS College, Changanacherry, she was selected by her teachers to play the central character in a telefilm titled Anakha, which was to be produced by the college's newly formed theatre club. The telefilm was aired in Asianet on Valentine's Day in 2006. Director Biju Varkey, who has made films like Phantom, noticed her and invited her to act in a non-commercial film titled Chandranilekkulla Vazhi. She acted as a village girl from a  background in the film. She was also part of the Malayalam film Indrajith.

Padmini was spotted by director P. Vasu and got her Tamil film debut in the 2011 film Puli Vesham, for which she was asked to change her name to Divya Padmini, adding her mother's maiden name to her name. Since then she was seen in few more Tamil films, like the Ilaiyaraaja musical Ayyan and Vilayada Vaa a film that focussed on carrom.

In 2007, she acted in her first serial Manapporutham. She was also part of a few other serials like Ammathottil and Sthreedhanam. She also acted in Tamil serials. She made her Tamil debut in Sun TV's serial Pillai Nila and she also acted in Kayitham, in which she plays a school teacher called Parvathy, produced by Samuthirakani.

Personal life
Padmini is from Kattappana in Idukki district. She is married to Ratish, an art director, and has settled in Mumbai.

Filmography

Television

Awards

References

External links
 

Living people
Actresses in Tamil cinema
21st-century Indian actresses
Actresses in Malayalam television
Actresses in Tamil television
Indian television actresses
Actresses in Malayalam cinema
People from Idukki district
Actresses from Kerala
1986 births